Qoşadizə or Qoşa Dizə or Goshadiza or Gasha-diza may refer to:
Qoşadizə, Babek, Azerbaijan
Qoşadizə, Ordubad, Azerbaijan